Over a three-day period from June 22 to 24, 2007, Chris Benoit, a 40-year-old Canadian professional wrestler employed by World Wrestling Entertainment (WWE) and living in Fayetteville, Georgia, murdered his wife Nancy and their 7-year-old son, Daniel, before hanging himself. Autopsy results showed that Benoit's wife was murdered first as she was bound at the feet and wrists and died of asphyxiation on the night of June 22. On June 25, Nancy was found wrapped in a towel with blood under her head, although Fayette County District Attorney Scott Ballard reported no other signs of a struggle.

The couple's son, Daniel Christopher Benoit, who also died of asphyxia, was killed as he was lying sedated in his bed on the morning of June 23. Then, on the evening of June 24, Benoit killed himself in his weight room, when he used his lat pulldown machine to hang himself. He placed  Bibles near the bodies of his wife and son. Since Benoit's suicide, numerous explanations for his actions have been proposed, including severe chronic traumatic encephalopathy (CTE), steroid and alcohol abuse, leading to a failing marriage and other personal problems. The incident led to numerous media accounts, and a federal investigation into steroid abuse in professional wrestling.

Murders and suicide

Nancy Benoit 

On Friday, June 22, 2007, Chris Benoit killed his wife Nancy in the bonus room of their house which was being used as an office. According to the police report, her limbs were bound prior to her death, with her arms being restrained with coaxial cables, and her feet being duct-taped together. A balled up combination of a tube sock and tape was also found in the kitchen trash and appeared to be soaked in dried blood, which led police to believe that it was being used as a makeshift gag prior to her death. Her body was found wrapped in a blanket. A copy of the Bible was left by her body. Injuries indicated that Benoit had pressed a knee into her back while pulling on a cord around her neck, causing strangulation. Officials said that there were no signs of immediate struggle. Toxicologists found alcohol in her body, but were unable to determine whether it had been present before death or was a decomposition product. Decomposition also made it difficult to estimate pre-death levels of hydrocodone and alprazolam, found in "therapeutic levels" in her body. In any case, her medical examiner saw no evidence that she was sedated as her son had been when he was killed.

Daniel Benoit 
Daniel Christopher Benoit (February 25, 2000June 23, 2007) was Chris' third child and second son, having older paternal half-siblings named David (born 1993) and Megan (born 1997) via Chris's first wife, Martina, who were all living in Canada at the time the murder-suicide took place. He was Nancy's only child, as she had no children with her ex-husbands Jim Daus or Kevin Sullivan.

Daniel was suffocated and killed in his bedroom, and a copy of the Bible was left by his body. Daniel had internal injuries to the throat area, showing no bruises. Daniel's exact time of death is unknown. The reports determined Daniel was sedated with Xanax and likely unconscious when he was killed. Daniel's body had also just started to show signs of decomposition but was not as far along as his mother's body.

It was later alleged that Daniel had Fragile X syndrome and that this was the cause of domestic problems in the Benoit family. It was also suggested that needle marks on Daniel's arms were the result of growth hormones given to him because Benoit and his family considered him undersized due to Fragile X. Benoit's coworker and best friend, wrestler Chris Jericho, stated that from his own research on the condition, the symptoms "fit Daniel to a tee, all across the board". Concerning those who had publicly stated that they had no knowledge of Daniel having the condition, Jericho said, "If Chris had decided that he wanted to keep it to himself, you wouldn't have been able to pry that out of him with anything." Despite Jericho's initial statements regarding Daniel, he later stated in his 2011 book Undisputed, "It turned out that Daniel didn't have Fragile X, but at the time it made sense because I was grasping at straws."

District Attorney Ballard later released a statement saying that a source with access to Daniel's medical files found no mention of any pre-existing mental or physical ailments. Likewise, Daniel Benoit's teachers reported that he was on par with other students and not about to be held back as previously thought. Speaking publicly for the first time in a major public interview on a Talk is Jericho podcast in 2016, Nancy's sister, Sandra Toffoloni, unequivocally denied any claims that Daniel had ever had Fragile X or any other such condition. She also stated that claims of needle track marks on Daniel's arms were "preposterous".

After the murders 
At about 3:30 p.m. EDT on Saturday, June 23, 2007, fellow wrestler and close friend Chavo Guerrero received a voicemail message from Benoit's phone stating that both Nancy and Daniel had food poisoning and he would be late for that night's house show in Beaumont, Texas. Guerrero called Benoit back and found that Benoit sounded tired and groggy as he confirmed everything that he had said in his voice message. Guerrero, who was "concerned about Benoit's tone and demeanor," called him back 12 minutes later. Benoit did not answer the call, and Guerrero left a message asking Benoit to call back.

At 3:44 p.m. EDT, Benoit called Guerrero back, stating that he had not answered the call because he was on the phone with Delta Air Lines changing his flight. Benoit stated that he had a stressful day due to Nancy and Daniel "being sick from food poisoning". Guerrero then replied with "All right man, if you need to talk, I'm here for you". Benoit ended the conversation by saying "Chavo, I love you". During a 2014 appearance on Chris Jericho's Talk is Jericho podcast, Guerrero said Benoit sounded "off" when he talked to him, especially when he said "I love you" with emphasis. Another co-worker who often traveled with Benoit called him from outside the Houston airport; Benoit answered and told the coworker that Nancy was vomiting blood and that Daniel was also vomiting. Benoit failed to show up for the house show in Beaumont, and left a voicemail on Chavo Guerrero's cell phone that he would be on a flight that would arrive in Houston at 8:00 a.m. CDT on the following Sunday morning. During this time, Benoit also called and left a voicemail for an unknown friend.

On Sunday, June 24, 2007, five text messages were sent to co-workers between 3:51 a.m. and 3:58 a.m. using both Chris and Nancy Benoit's cell phones. Four of them were the Benoits' address; the fifth said that the family's dogs were in the enclosed pool area, and also noted that a garage side door had been left open. Guerrero and referee Scott Armstrong were two of the recipients of these texts. Guerrero was woken up by the texts, and went back to sleep, telling himself that he was picking Benoit up at the Houston airport in a few hours. Benoit failed to show at the Houston airport on the flight that arrived at 8:00 a.m.

Late Sunday morning, Benoit called WWE's talent relations office stating that his son was vomiting, and that he and Nancy were at the hospital with him. He also stated that he would be taking a later flight into Houston where he was scheduled to face CM Punk for the vacant ECW World Championship at Vengeance: Night of Champions. Benoit failed to appear for the Vengeance: Night of Champions pay-per-view event in Houston on the night of Sunday, June 24.

Suicide 
Chris Benoit, according to District Attorney Ballard and the city sheriff, committed suicide by hanging. Benoit used a weight machine cord to hang himself by creating a noose from the end of the cord on a pull-down machine from which the bar had been removed. Benoit released the weights, causing his strangulation. Ballard said Benoit was found hanging from the pulley cable.

On the 2016 Talk is Jericho podcast, Nancy's sister Sandra Toffoloni clarified some details further. She said that over the weekend, the search history on Benoit's computer showed he had researched "the quickest and easiest way to break a neck". He had then later used a towel around his neck attached to the handle of the machine, which he pulled down using a very heavy weight and let go, breaking his neck instantly. However, the police report done by Fayette County Police Department states he had no damage to his neck area other than that which came from the cable around his neck. It also states the only thing he researched on his computer in that time period was that of the Prophet of Elijah and the resurrecting of a dead boy. No mention of the claims made by Toffoloni were on the police report and his autopsy report made no mention of damage to Benoit's cervical vertebrae, hyoid bone, trachea or larynx area, further indicating he didn't snap his neck as a manner of suicide.

Discovery of the bodies 
On Monday, June 25, 2007, WWE wrestlers and senior officials arrived in Corpus Christi for WWE Raw, which was to take place on that Monday night at the American Bank Center. As the early hours of the afternoon progressed and the show got closer to starting, WWE senior officials were increasingly concerned that they had not heard from Benoit in over 24 hours. Guerrero then showed WWE Vice President of Talent Relations John Laurinaitis (aka Johnny Ace) the texts that he and Armstrong had received from Chris and Nancy's cellphones in the early hours of Sunday. As some more time progressed without any contact from Benoit, WWE called the Fayetteville, Georgia, police for a welfare check at the Benoit household. After discovering the bodies, the police notified WWE around 4:15 p.m. (CDT), informing them that they had discovered three bodies at the Benoit home and the house was now ruled as a "major crime scene".

A suicide note was not discovered during the initial investigation, but one was later discovered in a Bible that had been among Benoit's possessions that were sent to his first wife (Martina Benoit) and their two children in Canada. Benoit's father Michael Benoit stated that Chris had left "a hand-written notation in there saying, 'I'm preparing to leave this Earth.'"

Memorial and cremation
A memorial for Nancy and Daniel took place in Daytona Beach, Florida, on July 14, 2007. Both were cremated and their ashes placed in starfish-shaped urns for Nancy's family. Chris was also cremated, following a private memorial service in Ardrossan, Alberta, on August 6, 2007, but the fate of his ashes has not been publicly revealed.

Possible motives 
WWE attorney Jerry McDevitt appeared on Live with Dan Abrams on July 17, 2007, and said that Benoit was prescribed testosterone as part of a treatment for testosterone replacement therapy, which McDevitt said was a common medical practice for people who had used steroids in the past, and had suffered testicular damage as a result.

Neuroscientist and former wrestler Christopher Nowinski stated that Benoit may have been suffering from repeated, untreated concussions throughout his wrestling career, ultimately leading to an unstable mental state. Nowinski was quoted as saying that Benoit "was one of the only guys who would take a chair shot to the back of the head ... which is stupid". Tests conducted on Benoit's brain by Julian Bailes, the head of neurosurgery at West Virginia University, showed "Benoit's brain was so severely damaged it resembled the brain of an 85-year-old Alzheimer's patient". Other tests conducted on Benoit's brain tissue revealed severe chronic traumatic encephalopathy (CTE), and damage to all four lobes of the brain and brain stem. Bailes and his colleagues concluded that repeated concussions can lead to dementia, which can contribute to severe behavioral problems. Benoit's father said that brain damage may have been the leading cause of the double murder-suicide. A statement released by WWE described this as "speculative".

Nancy Benoit had filed for divorce in May 2003, allegedly after domestic abuse from Chris, but had withdrawn it in August 2003. In February 2008, The Atlanta Journal-Constitution (AJC) reported that Nancy may have suspected her husband of having an affair with a female WWE wrestler, and that they may have also argued over a life insurance policy. The AJC claimed the source was a recently released report from the Fayette County Sheriff's Office.

Responses

World Wrestling Entertainment 

The deaths were first reported to fans of World Wrestling Entertainment (WWE) on their WWE Mobile Alerts Service and posted to its official website soon after. On its corporate website, the company released the following statement:

After Vince McMahon had gathered the wrestlers together to tell them that Chris, Nancy and Daniel had all died, WWE canceled the scheduled three-hour-long live Raw show that had been scheduled for a few hours later on the night of June 25 (which, coincidentally, was supposed to be a memorial for the Mr. McMahon character, who, on the June 11 episode of Raw, "died" in a limo explosion) that was scheduled to take place at the American Bank Center in Corpus Christi, Texas, and replaced the broadcast version with a tribute to Chris Benoit's life and career, featuring past matches, segments from the Hard Knocks: The Chris Benoit Story DVD, and comments from wrestlers and announcers from the Raw, SmackDown!, and ECW brands. Shortly after the program aired, many of the aired comments were posted on WWE.com. It was not until the last hour of the tribute program that reports surfaced one after the other that Chris, Nancy and Daniel had all died on different days over the weekend, and that the police were not looking for any other suspects, working under the belief that Chris Benoit murdered his wife and son before killing himself.

The next night, Tuesday, June 26, 2007, after details of the murder-suicide became available, the company aired a recorded statement by McMahon before its ECW broadcast:

On Friday, June 29, 2007, before the SmackDown! edition of that week, McMahon released another statement indicating that the related events of the tragedy were not known at the time. The rest of the statement remained the same as the first one.

After learning about the full details of his and his family's deaths, WWE quickly distanced itself from Chris Benoit:
 Except for his results and listings in WWE's title history (though the summaries of his title reigns have been removed), and select press releases from WWE's corporate subsite, the WWE website removed all past mentions of Benoit, including all news articles relating to the specific details of the incident, as well as his biography and the video tribute comments from Benoit's peers.
 WWE pulled the tribute episode from international markets which aired Raw on a tape-delay basis. Several channels announced the episode was being withheld for legal reasons. A substitute Raw, hosted by Todd Grisham from WWE Studios, was created featuring recaps of WWE Championship and World Heavyweight Championship matches which had occurred over the past year.
 Benoit's name was removed from his previous theme song "Rabid" on the MP3 release of WWE Anthology.
 Benoit, along with his "Crippler Crossface" and other signature moves, were removed from the WWE SmackDown vs. Raw 2008 video game, after Benoit was originally included in the game as a playable character. Starting with WWE SmackDown vs Raw 2010, the move was reinstated as "Crossface."
 WWE Classics On Demand, WWE's subscription video on demand service, began removing the likeness and mentions of both Chris and Nancy Benoit from archival footage.
 Matches and other footage involving Benoit appeared very sparingly on any WWE DVD releases following his death, with all of them being footage involving multiple wrestlers such as a battle royal or a multiple-person tag team match. The WCW WarGames DVD by WWE, which features all of the WarGames matches, does include the 1997 WCW Fall Brawl WarGames match between the nWo and the Four Horsemen, featuring Benoit (who was not involved in the finish of the match), but has commentary about Benoit edited out,
 On the WWE Network, a parental advisory warning is shown before a program that features Benoit. The WWE Network shows the June 25, 2007 internationally aired episode of Raw featuring several world title matches instead of the original Benoit tribute show. The opening promo for the June 26, 2007 ECW show with Vince McMahon, mentioning Benoit, has also been omitted from the broadcast. Several pay-per-view posters which featured Benoit have been replaced with new artwork on the Network's menu screen. Matches listed for shows and pay-per-views that have Benoit in them don't mention him by name, but instead list his opponent(s) and stipulation. Additionally, entering Benoit's name into the Network's search function will return no results.
 In 2015, Benoit's name was mentioned as part of the WWE Network's Monday Night Wars series that looks back at the fall of WCW. A segment in the series talked about the 2000 Invasion storyline with Benoit and his Radicalz stablemates Eddie Guerrero, Dean Malenko, and Perry Saturn. However, barring an establishing shot, Benoit was omitted from all footage and photographs featured of the group. 
 Canadian rock band Our Lady Peace, who had written Benoit's theme song "Whatever" in 2001, were asked if they would ever perform the song again in a 2012 interview with The Huffington Post. Band members Raine Maida and Steve Mazur responded that they felt they could not, given the circumstances of Benoit's death. 
 WWE included the moment when Randy Orton pinned Benoit at SummerSlam 2004 to capture his first World Heavyweight Championship in a promotional video for the match between Orton and John Cena at TLC 2013. However, Benoit's face cannot be seen. This was also done in videos for the build up to Orton's 14th world championship win against Drew Mcintyre in 2020.
 In Kurt Angle's Hall of Fame video upon his induction in 2017, WWE briefly showed a clip of his match with Chris Benoit. However, the shot is distant and Benoit's face cannot be seen.
 On a 2020 episode of Raw after Summerslam emanating from WWE's ThunderDome, a fan showed an image of Chris Benoit in a prominently featured position during Drew Mcintyre's segment. This was apparently the last picture of Benoit taken before his death.

Professional wrestling industry 
Numerous individuals in professional wrestling, past and present, commented on the deaths and their aftermath:
 Hulk Hogan commented on Benoit's personality and his thoughts on the crime, saying: "He was peaceful and kept to himself," and, "I think it had to be something personal, a domestic problem between him and his wife."
 Kurt Angle chose to comment more on the frenzy created by the crime, stating, "This is not WWE's fault, and this is not Vince McMahon's fault. Chris Benoit was responsible for his own actions."
 Eric Bischoff discussed the media frenzy, saying: "It's clear that the media wants to blame steroids, professional wrestling, Vince McMahon, or anyone or anything else that further sensationalizes this family tragedy. I refuse to join the choir. I don't have enough information. I wasn't there. I am not a psychiatrist. I just can't imagine how or why this could have happened."
 Other wrestlers also commented, including Lex Luger, Marc Mero, Ted DiBiase Sr., Bret Hart, Randy Orton, Kevin Nash, Lance Storm, Chyna, Steve Blackman, Rob Van Dam, The Ultimate Warrior, New Jack, John Cena, Chris Jericho, and William Regal. Vince McMahon and his wife Linda (WWE CEO) were interviewed (separate and jointly) by various news outlets. Some wrestlers, such as "Dr. Death" Steve Williams wrote posts on their websites and social media pages.
 CM Punk, who was scheduled to face Benoit at the Vengeance: Night of Champions pay-per-view the night he died, was among the many WWE personnel that commented on Benoit during the three-hour tribute show on Raw. He also briefly touched on the subject of the Benoit murder/suicide in a 2011 interview with GQ. He described it as "a pretty... low point in everyone's life. A lot of people don't like to talk about it. It still blows my mind." At the 2012 San Diego Comic-Con International during an interview session with wrestlers including Punk, he was asked if WWE was trying to erase Benoit from history. Punk responded that while Benoit is in the history books and that cannot be changed, it does not make any sense for WWE to further promote him, due to "the horrific nature of what he did".
 Sean Waltman, in a 2014 interview, said of Benoit: "He was a pleasant guy, but always had a darkness about him ... a sadness, or something." Waltman added that Benoit had a bleak sense of humor, finding amusement in "things that were a little bit bent."
 Paul Heyman, in a 2019 interview with Inside the Ropes, briefly mentioned Benoit during an interview focused on Brock Lesnar after a fan kept interrupting whenever Heyman mentioned Benoit's name, and said: "Three people died in that house that night, and only one person [Benoit] had the choice behind it, as the other two [Nancy and Daniel] didn't have a choice to die." Heyman also stated that he doesn't care about CTE being the motive behind Benoit's actions, and while forever respecting Benoit as a performer, lost any and all respect and compassion for him personally following the incident.

Media 
When the news was released about Benoit's death, most mainstream news outlets covered the story, including MSNBC and Fox News Channel. Benoit made the cover of People magazine. ECW Press (which has no affiliation with Extreme Championship Wrestling, a promotion for which Benoit once worked though their initials are the same) announced on July 16 that noted wrestling writer Irvin Muchnick had written a book on the Benoit case, due out in 2008. At the Comedy Central Roast of Flavor Flav in August 2007, Jimmy Kimmel joked to honoree Flavor Flav that "Chris Benoit is a better father than Flavor Flav", which drew a shocked, appalled response, and laughs from the crowd. The show aired less than two months after the incident, but no reference was made to the taping date of the episode in question.

Bill Apter in 2015 speculated the murders were a professional hit.

Government 
With Benoit and his death allegedly linked to steroid abuse, WWE underwent investigation by the United States House Committee on Oversight and Government Reform regarding their talent wellness policy. Congress did not take action against either the WWE or any other professional wrestling company in the wake of the event. In January 2009, Henry Waxman, outgoing chairman of the House Committee on Oversight and Government Reform, requested that the Office of National Drug Control Policy chief, John P. Walters, "examine steroid use in professional wrestling and take appropriate steps to address this problem." In the letter, Waxman stated, "In the first year of WWE's testing program, which began in March 2006, 40% of wrestlers tested positive for steroids and other drugs, even after being warned in advance that they were going to be tested." He also wrote about how wrestlers who test positive for performance enhancers receive light punishment and afterwards can often participate in wrestling events. The committee investigation also uncovered how easily wrestlers can secure "therapeutic use exemptions" (TUEs, permission to take banned substances for medical reasons) so they can continue performing while using steroids. When Waxman's staff interviewed Dr. Tracy Ray, a physician contracted by WWE, Ray claimed there was "shadiness in almost every [TUE] case that I've reviewed."

Chronic traumatic encephalopathy reports 
At the time of the incident, research into chronic traumatic encephalopathy (CTE), led by forensic neuropathologist Bennet Omalu, in former players of gridiron football was a fast-growing issue in the sport that had been at the forefront following Dr. Omalu's 2002 report on Pro Football Hall of Fame member Mike Webster done after his death. Subsequent postmortem analyses of the brains of recently deceased NFL players agreed with the report on Webster's death, as each player showed the kind of brain damage previously seen in people with Alzheimer's disease or dementia, as well as in some retired boxers. Michael Benoit agreed to have his son's brain analyzed by the same neurosurgeons. On September 5, 2007, Julian Bailes, the chief of neurosurgery at West Virginia University, conducted a news conference in New York City to announce the results of Benoit's postmortem brain examination.

In December 2009, nearly 30 months after Benoit's death, Dr. Omalu confirmed to ESPN's Outside the Lines that the death of a second WWE wrestler, Andrew Martin, known in WWE by his ring name Test, was attributed to CTE. Bailes told ESPN, "When we announced our findings about Chris, some in the media said it was 'roid rage. We said at the time the real finding was that repeated head trauma was the cause.  With Andrew Martin as the second case, the WWE and the sport in general have to ask themselves, 'Is this a trend?' The science tells us that jumping off 10-foot ladders and slamming people with tables and chairs is simply bad for the brain."

WWE noted the research was new at the time but released the following statement to ESPN for Outside the Lines:

In the decade that followed after the broadcast, postmortem brain research on numerous deceased wrestlers diagnosed findings consistent with CTE.  Wrestlers diagnosed with CTE in postmortem research include Axl Rotten, Balls Mahoney, Jimmy Snuka, Mr. Fuji, and Ron Bass.

Over 60 professional wrestlers and representatives of deceased wrestlers filed lawsuits against WWE, with attorney Konstantine Kyros representing them. The litigation claims WWE concealed the risks of injury, specifically CTE. United States District Judge Vanessa Lynne Bryant dismissed the lawsuits in September 2018. Bryant said the Benoit tragedy did not cause WWE to recognize a link between CTE and professional wrestling but stated: "The circumstances surrounding Mr. Benoit's death were so tragic and so horrifying that it would have been reasonable for his fellow wrestlers to follow news developments about him and about CTE, through which they could have deduced that they were at risk of developing CTE and sought medical opinions about risks to their own health." The United States Court of Appeals for the Second Circuit rejected an appeal in September 2020 and the Supreme Court of the United States declined to hear the case in April 2021.

Steroids debate

Background 
Steroids were found in the home, leading some media organizations to hypothesize that a steroid-induced rage may be the cause of Benoit's actions, as some doctors have linked steroid use to uncontrollable anger, among other psychological issues which include paranoia. WWE released a press-statement, challenging the "roid-rage" claims. One part of the statement reads:

Prosecutors in New York investigated the deliveries Benoit received from Signature Pharmacy and MedXLife.com, which sold steroids and human growth hormone (HGH) over the internet. Terence Kindlon, the lawyer for MedXLife co-owner Gary Brandwein, denied allegations that his client's company sold steroids to Benoit. Brandwein pleaded not guilty to six counts in New York state court related to the criminal sale of a controlled substance. According to a report from Sports Illustrated, three packages sent to Benoit were from Signature Pharmacy with the first one sent in December 2005 to San Antonio, Texas. The second package was sent on February 13, 2006, to an address in Peachtree City, Georgia and the third package was sent in July 2006 to Fort Walton Beach, Florida. This followed eleven wrestlers that were announced in a Sports Illustrated steroids investigation that began March 2007, which included Kurt Angle, Eddie Guerrero, Oscar Gutierrez (Rey Mysterio, Jr.), Adam Copeland (Edge) and Gregory Helms, with Copeland receiving a high amount of steroids.

WWE attorney Jerry McDevitt stated that "they believe the facts of this crime do not support the hypothesis that 'roid rage' played a role in the murders." They cite evidence of premeditation in addition to the lack of a toxicology report, and the fact that the steroids found within Benoit's home were legally prescribed. Gary I. Wadler, who served on the World Anti-Doping Agency's Prohibited List and Methods Committee, and its Health, Medicine, and Research Committee agreed stating that "that was a premeditated act and that's not rage". Investigators seized both Chris and Nancy's medical records. They also have medical records of Mark Jindrak, Hardcore Holly (Robert Howard), Lex Luger (Lawrence Pfohl), Rey Mysterio, Jr., Buff Bagwell (Marcus Bagwell), and Johnny Grunge (Mike Durham), all of whom were patients of  Phil Astin.

Toxicology results 
At the press conference held by the Georgia Bureau of Investigation on July 17, 2007, it was announced that three different drugs were found in Nancy Benoit's system: hydrocodone, hydromorphone and Xanax. All three drugs were found to be at levels investigators considered normal for therapeutic treatment (as opposed to recreational use or abuse). A blood-alcohol level was found to be 0.184. Kris Sperry, the medical examiner, added it was impossible to say whether any of the blood findings were due to ingestion of alcohol or the post-mortem process. It was also ruled out that Nancy was sedated by Chris before she was murdered.

Xanax was found in Daniel Benoit's system. District Attorney Scott Ballard noted this was not a drug that would be given to a child under normal circumstances. It is believed that Daniel was sedated before being murdered, with Sperry ruling out that Daniel died of a drug overdose. The GBI, however, said in the press conference that it could not perform tests for steroids or human growth hormones on Daniel because of a lack of urine.

Xanax and hydrocodone were also found in Chris Benoit's system, at levels investigators called consistent with therapeutic use. Elevated levels of the synthetic anabolic steroid testosterone cypionate were found in his urine; investigators believed that the level found suggested it had been taken recently. While the synthetic anabolic steroid testosterone cypionate was found in his urine, there was no evidence of GHB contrary to speculation. Benoit also tested negative for blood alcohol.

Drug charges against Benoit's doctor 
Phil C. Astin III was the personal doctor for Chris Benoit. His attorney, Manny Aurora, asked a judge to throw out evidence seized during a raid on Astin's office after Benoit and his family died. He claimed the search exceeded authority granted in a search warrant and that police seized other patients' records and three years of bank records and computers. According to the Associated Press in February 2008, Astin was charged with overprescribing medication in a case not connected to Benoit. On January 29, 2009, he admitted he illegally prescribed drugs, sometimes without examining the patients first, and pleaded guilty to all 175 counts against him. He was sentenced to ten years in prison.

Wikipedia controversy 

A statement regarding Nancy Benoit's death was added to the Chris Benoit English Wikipedia article 14 hours before police discovered the bodies of Benoit and his family. This seemingly prescient addition was initially reported on Wikinews and later on Fox News. The article originally read: "Chris Benoit was replaced by Johnny Nitro for the ECW World Championship match at Vengeance, as Benoit was not there due to personal issues, stemming from the death of his wife Nancy." The phrase "stemming from the death of his wife Nancy" was added at 4:01 a.m. EDT on June 25, whereas the Fayette County police reportedly discovered the bodies of the Benoit family at 2:30 p.m. EDT (10 hours, 29 minutes later). The IP address of the editor was traced to Stamford, Connecticut, which is also the location of WWE headquarters. After news of the early death notice reached mainstream media, the anonymous poster accessed Wikinews to explain his edit as a "huge coincidence and nothing more."

Police detectives "seized computer equipment from the man held responsible for the postings" and called the posting an unbelievable "hindrance" to their investigation, but believed he was otherwise uninvolved, declining to press charges. The man had found several rumors online, which supported his theory about the Benoit "family emergency" as reported in wrestling news. The IP from which he made the edit was tentatively traced to vandalizing the Wikipedia entries for African wild ass, The Bronx, The Sopranos, Ron Artest, Stacy Keibler, and Naugatuck, Connecticut. He also reverted vandalism to Chavo Guerrero Jr. and recorded a loss for the Golden State Warriors.

Aftermath and legacy 
In the years following the double-murder and suicide, it continued to be referred to in the media. The Great American Bash pay-per-view on July 20, 2008, was the last WWE pay-per-view with a TV-14 rating; WWE immediately thereafter adopted their current TV-PG rating, which resulted in a noticeable toning down of edgy content in shows. Within a few months, blood was severely toned down, which returned WWE's product to its pre-1997 rule on prohibiting deliberate blading in matches.

The removal of Benoit from WWE media was extensive with the organization immediately opting to remove any and all references to Benoit in all of their media. This also included significant matches with his involvement from pay-per-views including main events. In recent years, WWE has softened its policy and matches he participated in began to appear on the WWE network not long after its launch. While Benoit's matches began to appear again, his name would not appear in any descriptions of the event and searching with his name would yield no results. WWE has also mentioned his name in lists regarding the lineages of titles that he also held, though with no links or biographical information present for Benoit's reigns. WWE would take similar actions with other wrestlers in later years, notably with Jimmy Snuka for his 2015 arrest regarding the death of Nancy Argentino, and Hulk Hogan following the release of a tape that included Hogan making racist comments (see Bollea v. Gawker). As both men were members of the WWE Hall of Fame, the company would remove them from the hall. Journalists and fans compared their removals to the scale of Benoit's, though Snuka and Hogan would eventually have these actions be reversed and both would be reinstated into the Hall of Fame with Hogan being inducted a second time for his work with the NWO in 2020.

There have been discussions about whether or not Benoit would ever be inducted into the WWE Hall of Fame. Steve Austin predicted that Benoit, although important to the business, would never be inducted into the Hall of Fame due to his actions. Jericho also stated that Benoit should never be in the Hall of Fame. Benoit's eldest son David however, believes that his father will be inducted into the Hall Of Fame. Vickie Guerrero, widow of Benoit's best friend and Hall Of Famer Eddie Guerrero has also approved of Benoit being inducted into the Hall Of Fame. Some journalists, fans and wrestlers, including Hall of Famer Mick Foley, have advocated for the inclusion of Nancy into the Hall of Fame for her work in World Championship Wrestling and Extreme Championship Wrestling as a valet and manager.

On July 26–27, 2012, the rap group Insane Clown Posse released a music video for the song "Chris Benoit". The song and music video, however, are not about Benoit himself, but a man's breakdown that is similar to Benoit's. The song and music video do include stock footage and a recording of Chris Benoit before his death. A remix with rappers Ice Cube and Scarface was later released with Ice Cube's verse being entirely about Benoit.
In a July 2013 interview, Sandra Toffoloni (Nancy Benoit's sister) said she believes a blackout caused him to murder her sister. She stated that the medical examiner who examined Benoit's body stated he had only ten more months to live due to an enlarged heart. Toffoloni also stated that Benoit was contemplating retiring and opening a wrestling school, but decided to continue wrestling due to being in one of the main events at Vengeance for the ECW World Championship.
A biopic titled Crossface was announced in 2011, which would have been based on Matthew Randazzo's book Ring of Hell: The Story of Chris Benoit and the Fall of the Pro Wrestling Industry. The film would have shown Benoit, from his early days being trained by the Hart family, to his rise with ECW, WCW and WWE, to the deaths of his wife and son, and his suicide. Liev Schreiber was set to portray Benoit. Filming was set to begin in 2012; however, according to Chris' eldest son David, the film was cancelled following a legal dispute with the Benoit family.
 In March 2020, Vice's Dark Side of the Ring released a two-hour documentary episode about the incident featuring family (his son David and Sandra Toffoloni) and close friends in the wrestling industry (Chavo Guerrero Jr., Vickie Guerrero, Jim Ross, Dean Malenko, and Chris Jericho).

See also
 List of premature professional wrestling deaths
List of murdered American children

References

External links 
 NPR: Wikipedia Entry Presaged Wrestler's Wife's Death

2007 in Georgia (U.S. state)
2007 in professional wrestling
2007 murders in the United States
2007 suicides
Crimes in Georgia (U.S. state)
Deaths by person in Georgia (U.S. state)
Familicides
History of WWE
June 2007 crimes
June 2007 events in the United States
Murder in Georgia (U.S. state)
Murder–suicides in Georgia (U.S. state)
Professional wrestling controversies
Professional wrestling in Georgia (U.S. state)
Wikipedia controversies